The Army Public School, Delhi Cantt is a school located in the Delhi Cantt area, in Delhi, India.
It is operated under Indian Army supervision under the aegis of Indian Army welfare Education society (AWES). The school was founded in 1989 and has nearly about 3700 students.

Most of the students in this school are from Army Background.

The school was renamed as Army Public School Delhi Cantt wef 19 March 2002. The School at present is a full-fledged Senior Secondary School from class I to XII recognized by the Directorate of Education, Delhi Administration and is affiliated with Central Board of Secondary Education (CBSE). It has 3700 students on its roll in 88 sections in classes from I to XII.

House system 

Schools in Delhi
Indian Army Public Schools

Session: April to March